"Al's Place" is a song written by Robert Allen and recorded by Al Hirt. The song reached #57 on the Billboard Hot 100 and #13 on the Adult Contemporary chart in 1965.

References

1965 singles
Al Hirt songs
Songs with music by Robert Allen (composer)
1965 songs
RCA Victor singles